Henrik Svarrer is a retired male badminton player from Denmark.

Svarrer competed in badminton at the 1992 Summer Olympics in men's doubles with Jan Paulsen. They lost in quarterfinals to Li Yongbo and Tian Bingyi, of China, 15-11, 12-15, 17-14.

Achievements

European Championships 
Men's doubles

IBF World Grand Prix 
The World Badminton Grand Prix sanctioned by International Badminton Federation (IBF) from 1983 to 2006.
Men's doubles

External links
Olympiske lege at Danish Badminton Federation

Living people
Danish male badminton players
Badminton players at the 1992 Summer Olympics
Badminton players at the 1996 Summer Olympics
Olympic badminton players of Denmark
1964 births
People from Esbjerg
Sportspeople from the Region of Southern Denmark